Dudley Park is a suburb of Mandurah, located immediately south of Mandurah's central area.

References

Suburbs of Mandurah